Recaredo Calimag (born June 10, 1978), better known as Ricky Calimag, is a Filipino former professional basketball player. He last played for the Powerade Tigers in the Philippine Basketball Association.

References

Living people
San Beda Red Lions basketball players
1978 births
Filipino men's basketball players
People from Isabela (province)
Basketball players from Isabela (province)
Power forwards (basketball)
Small forwards
Tanduay Rhum Masters players
Sta. Lucia Realtors players
Powerade Tigers players
Philippines men's national basketball team players
Southeast Asian Games gold medalists for the Philippines
Southeast Asian Games competitors for the Philippines
Southeast Asian Games medalists in basketball
Competitors at the 2003 Southeast Asian Games
Ilocano people
Tanduay Rhum Masters draft picks